The small-spine tadpole-goby (Benthophilus mahmudbejovi) is a species of goby, a small fish native to the eastern coasts of the Caspian Sea and the lower reaches of the Volga River up to Volgograd. In the sea it is recorded from the Cape Peschany to the Çeleken Peninsula and Ogurja Ada Island in the south. It is abundant the Volga River delta. This species can reach a length of  TL. The specific name honours the Azerbaijani ichthyologist A. A. Mahmudbekov, studied the fish of the Caspian Sea for much of his life.

References

External links

Fish of the Caspian Sea
Fish of Central Asia
Fish of Russia
Benthophilus
Endemic fauna of the Caspian Sea
Fish described in 1976